Gdynia Port Centralny is a PKP freight railway station in Gdynia (Pomeranian Voivodeship), Poland.

Lines crossing the station

References 
Gdynia Port Centralny article at Polish Stations Database, URL accessed at 16 Mar 2006

Port Centralny